Kentucky Route 313 (KY 313) is a  state highway in the U.S. state of Kentucky. The highway connects rural areas of Hardin and Meade counties with Radcliff and Vine Grove. The stretch from I-65 to Flaherty Road is also known as the Joe Prather Highway.

Route description

Hardin County
KY 313 begins at an interchange with Interstate 65 (I-65) in the southeastern part of Fort Knox, within Hardin County. It travels to the west-southwest, traveling through the southern part of the Army base, crosses over some railroad tracks, crosses over KY 434 (Battle Training Road), and crosses over Mud Creek. Then, it curves to the west-northwest and has an interchange with KY 434. KY 313 winds its way to the west and crosses over Brewer Hollow. It then crosses over Cedar Creek and then curves to the west-southwest before it has an intersection with the northern terminus of KY 251 (Shepherdsville Road). The highway crosses over Mill Creek. It then leaves the base and enters Radcliff. It intersects U.S. Route 31W (US 31W; South Dixie Boulevard). It temporarily leaves the city limits of Radcliff and curves to the northwest, begins paralleling Brushy Fork and re-enters the city. It intersects KY 361 (Patriot Parkway). The two highways begin to run concurrently here. They intersect the southern terminus of KY 1646 (South Logsdon Parkway). They then leave Radcliff and enter Vine Grove. After an intersection with KY 1500 (Rogersville Road), they leave the fork and intersect KY 144 (Highland Avenue). They curve to the west-northwest, intersect the southern terminus of KY 1815 (West Lincoln Trail Boulevard) and cross over some railroad tracks of the Paducah & Louisville Railway. At this point, they travel in a nearly due west direction and have a second intersection with KY 1500 (Knox Avenue). At this intersection, KY 361 splits off from KY 313, while KY 313 leaves the city limits of Vine Grove. A short distance later, it enters Meade County.

Meade County
KY 313 crosses over Otter Creek and intersects KY 1882 (Old Fort Avenue). At this intersection, KY 144 begins to run concurrently with KY 313. They curve to the west-northwest and split. It curves to the northwest and intersects KY 1816 (Rabbit Run Road). KY 144 begins to additionally run concurrently with KY 313. They continue to the northwest and intersect the eastern terminus of KY 333 (Big Spring Road). They continue to the northwest and intersect US 60. Shortly after its junction with US 60, KY 144 leaves KY 313 and heads towards Garrett. KY 313 continues traveling northwestward until it reaches the Brandenburg city limits. There, it intersects KY 448, and heads around the west side of Brandenburg. The route terminates at the Matthew E. Welsh Bridge across the Ohio River. A portion of KY 313 around Brandenburg from KY 79 to KY 448 was assigned as KY 1051.

Major intersections

See also

References

0313
Transportation in Hardin County, Kentucky
Transportation in Meade County, Kentucky
Fort Knox